Van Gilder may refer to:

Laura Van Gilder (born 1964), American cyclist
Van Gilder Hotel, historic building in Seward, Alaska, United States